Kazimierz Andrew "Casey" Siemaszko (born March 17, 1961) is an American actor. He had supporting roles in Back to the Future and Stand By Me. He starred in Three O'Clock High.

Personal life
Siemaszko was born in Chicago and grew up on the city's northwest side.  He attended Saint Ignatius College Preparatory School and graduated from the Goodman School of Drama at DePaul University in 1983.  His father, Konstanty (1918–1999), was a Polish Roman Catholic and a former member of the Polish Navy.  He joined the Polish Underground and was a survivor of the Sachsenhausen concentration camp.  He emigrated to Chicago in 1959 and became a well-known local choreographer and a fixture in the Polish community.   His mother, Collette McAllister (1931–2008), was English. His sister  Nina is an actress and his brother, Corky, is a writer for Daily News and a reporter for NBC News.

Filmography

Film

Television

Video games

References

External links
 
 

1961 births
Living people
20th-century American male actors
21st-century American male actors
American male film actors
American male television actors
American male voice actors
American people of English descent
American people of Polish descent
DePaul University alumni
Male actors from Chicago
Polish-American culture in Chicago
St. Ignatius College Prep alumni